Sabyrkhan Nurlykhanuly Ibrayev is a Kazakhstani football midfielder who plays for FC Makhtaaral.

Career

Club
In 2020, Ibrayev joined FC Makhtaaral.

International
Ibrayev made his debut for Kazakhstan on 23 May 2008 against Russia in a friendly match.

Career statistics

Club

International

Statistics accurate as of match played 6 June 2009

References

External links

1988 births
Association football midfielders
Kazakhstani footballers
Living people
Kazakhstan international footballers
Kazakhstan Premier League players
FC Irtysh Pavlodar players
FC Maktaaral players
FC Tobol players
FC Kairat players
FC Zhetysu players